Toshiko at Top of the Gate is a live jazz (quintet) album by pianist Toshiko Akiyoshi.  It was recorded at the Top of the Gate in New York City in July 1968 and was released by Nippon Columbia and Denon Records.

Track listing 
LP side A
(Introductions) – 0:35
"Opus No. Zero" (Akiyoshi) – 8:13
"First Night" (Akiyoshi) – 3:21
"Phrygian Waterfall" (Akiyoshi) – 3:53
"Let's Roll in Sake" (Akiyoshi) – 3:17
LP side B
"How Insensitive" (Jobim) – 3:38
"Morning of the Carnival" (Bonfá) – 3:17
"The Night Song" (Strouse, Adams) – 3:33
"Willow Weep for Me" (Ronell) – 2:29
"My Elegy" (Akiyoshi) – 7:30

Personnel
Toshiko Akiyoshi – piano
Kenny Dorham – trumpet
Lew Tabackin – tenor saxophone, flute 
Ron Carter – bass
Mickey Roker – drums

References / External links
Dryden, Ken. Allmusic ([ link]) 
Nippon Columbia XMS-10008CT 
Denon 32C38-7874

Toshiko Akiyoshi live albums
1968 live albums
Nippon Columbia albums
Albums recorded at the Village Gate